Herbert "Herb" Simon (born October 23, 1934) is an American real estate developer. He resides in Indianapolis, Indiana. He was educated at the City College of New York. He is the owner of the Indiana Pacers, and chairman emeritus of the shopping mall developer Simon Property Group.  In 2010, he purchased Kirkus Reviews.

Forbes estimated his net worth to be around US$3.2 billion in mid-2018.

Early life and education
Simon was born to a Jewish family in Williamsburg, Brooklyn and grew up in the Bronx, the son of Max and Mae Simon. His father was a tailor who had emigrated from Central Europe. His older brother is the late Melvin Simon. His oldest brother is the late Fred Simon, who was the longtime leasing director at Simon Property Group. Herbert Simon graduated from The City College of New York with a B.B.A. in Business.

Personal life
Simon has been married three times. His first wife was Sheila Simon. they have two children.

In 1981, Simon married Diane Meyer, political staffer for Senator Birch Bayh of Indiana. They divorced in 2000. They have three children.

In 2002, Simon married Porntip Bui Nakhirunkanok (born February 7, 1969, Bangkok, Thailand), Miss Universe 1988. They have five children.

Indiana Pacers
In 1983, Simon and his brother, Mel (1927–2009), purchased the NBA's Indiana Pacers from Sam Nassi and Frank Mariani. He is also the owner of the WNBA's Indiana Fever, and formerly owned the USL's now defunct Reno 1868 FC.

References

External links
Indianapolis Star background piece on the Simon Property Group

1934 births
Living people
People from the Bronx
People from Williamsburg, Brooklyn
American billionaires
American company founders
20th-century American Jews
American real estate businesspeople
City College of New York alumni
Indiana Fever owners
Indiana Pacers personnel
Real estate and property developers
Simon family (real estate)
Simon Property Group people
21st-century American Jews